Blacktail (also known as Black Tail) is a ghost town in Lawrence County, South Dakota, United States.

Blacktail was named for the black-tailed deer spotted by a settler near the town site. Blacktail was an early mining camp in which some of the Homestake Mine's mills operated. While the town flourished for a while, it eventually became a ghost town. It was located between Central City and Gayville, and in the area where Blacktail Gulch and Bobtail Gulch meet.

See also
Lead, South Dakota

References

Geography of Lawrence County, South Dakota
Ghost towns in South Dakota
Mining communities in South Dakota
Black Hills